Martin McCann is a singer in the Dublin-based band Sack who has written songs such as "Laughter Lines", which the British singer-songwriter Morrissey stated "should be number one forever". McCann is also a prominent DJ on the Dublin gay scene.

References 

Irish male singer-songwriters
Year of birth missing (living people)
Living people
Place of birth missing (living people)